Mechelle Chanai Lewis Freeman (born September 20, 1980) is an American track and field athlete who specializes in the 100 meters and 4x100 meter relay.  Mechelle, an Oxon Hill, Maryland native, was a 2007 Pan American double Silver Medalist, 2007 World Champion and 2008 USA Olympian.

Lewis represented the United States at the 2008 Summer Olympic Games in Beijing, China. She competed on the 4x100 meter relay together with Angela Williams, Torri Edwards and Lauryn Williams. In their first round heat they were however disqualified and eliminated.

Through motivational speaking, Mechelle is committed to inspiring others to acknowledge, understand and reach their full potential and serve as a vessel in helping raise a healthier generation of American youth. She has a prestigious client list including, the Girl Scouts, Duke Children's Hospital and Health Center, YMCA, and Anulex Technologies. Mechelle was the Commencement Speaker at the 2009 Graduation for Thomas A. Edison High School (Fairfax County, Virginia).

Mechelle is also a committed member of the Delta Sigma Theta sorority, Raleigh Alumnae Chapter and is currently training for the London 2012 Summer Olympics.

Younger Years
Born in Washington, D.C. to Eddie and Chandra Lewis, and raised in Fort Washington, Maryland, Mechelle is the youngest of a set of twin girls. Both were highly active and successful in sports at a young age taking on basketball and soccer. They spent their summers competing in AAU basketball tournaments and their fall seasons winning soccer championships for the Oxon Hill Boys & Girls Club. Ironically however, after easily winning all of her events at a track meet held during her 8th grade P.E. class, Mechelle was approached by a high school scout who told her that she should look into taking on track and field. Once in high school, Mechelle and her sister would make one of the most significant decisions in their lives and decided to quit basketball to begin their Track & Field career.

High school
Mechelle really came into her own as an athlete at Oxon Hill High School. Lettering in both soccer and track, the decision to take running seriously would propel her to becoming a Maryland state record holder, where she held the state record in the 55m for 3 years with a time of 6.94s.  Mechelle was also the 300m regional champion and the MVP of her high school indoor and outdoor track team three years in a row.  She made the Prince George's County All-County Team three years as well as the All-Metropolitan team, representing the best select few athletes in the Maryland, DC, and Northern Virginia area. Her high school track team was third in the county three times and finished in the top three twice at the state championships. Mechelle's 4 × 400 m relay team won the state title three consecutive years and came in third at the National High School Indoor Track & Field Championships in 1997. With nationally recognized success, Mechelle also brought home championships competing in the USATF Junior Olympics for the Rising Stars track club. Mechelle kept busy off the track as well, winning Homecoming queen her senior year and operating in her role as the Senior Class Vice President. She also enjoyed playing in the band, mastering both the flute and the oboe. After going through a rigorous process of elimination, both Mechelle and her sister chose to run track at the University of South Carolina where they both received full scholarships to do so.

College Years
Lewis attended the University of South Carolina, from 1998-2004 where she obtained her Bachelors and master's degrees in Mass Communications. She was a three-time All-American athlete in the 60m, 200m, and the 4 × 100 m relay. She held the school record in the 55m for two years with a time of 6.84s. Mechelle also competed on the team that brought the first national championship in any sport to her school when her team won the 2002 Track & Field Outdoor Championships.  She accompanied the team to the White House to meet President Bush for the honor. In the classroom, Lewis received the Highest GPA honor in her freshman class at the University of South Carolina with a 4.0 GPA and went on to graduate with honors. She was also honored as one of the 2002 "Top 25 Most Promising Minority Students" in the country from the American Advertising Federation during her senior year.

After College
Mechelle graduated from college cum laude with a 3.6 GPA, and from graduate school with a 3.8 GPA.  After experiencing several injuries in college, she left sports to pursue a business career. She moved to New York City and worked at one of the world's top advertising agencies, Young & Rubicam, serving Xerox and the United Negro College Fund.

After two years at Young & Rubicam, Mechelle decided to return her focus to track and field; she relocated to North Carolina to begin a fully committed training regimen.  Although briefly sidelined by further injuries, Mechelle rebounded and went on to become a 2007 Pan American double Silver Medalist, 2007 World Champion, and 2008 Olympian.

USA Track & Field

2008 Olympics
Sponsored by Nike, Xerox, Lifestyle Family Fitness and Young & Rubicam in the 2008 Beijing Olympics, Lewis competed in the 4 × 100 m with USA teammates Angela Williams, Torri Edwards and Lauryn Williams.  However, they were disqualified after a missed hand-off in the semifinal between teammates Torri Edwards and Lauryn Williams.

2010 USATF Annual Meeting
In December, Mechelle was elected to serve as the USATF Elite Athlete Communications Liaison, as well as the USATF Athletes Advisory Committee Women's Sprints Event Leader.  Mechelle is excited about her new role as she gears up for the 2011 season.

Off the Track
Outside of track & field, Mechelle uses her platform, Do It Afraid!, to encourage individuals to recognize their self-worth and
move forward in life facing their fears head on. Mechelle is also involved with Athletes for Hope. She enjoys hosting and speaking at events, participating in fitness clinics, and advocating for healthy-living awareness.

Her mission is to enable individuals to be transformed throughout their mind, body and spirit by providing essential knowledge and exposure to prepare individuals to live overall healthy lives. Mechelle is also a certified Zumba Instructor.

In addition, she founded the non-profit TrackGirlz, a 501c3 to promote mentorship to girls through track and field, in 2015.

Achievements

Personal bests

All information from IAAF Profile

Competition record

See also
 World Fit

References

 

1980 births
Living people
American female sprinters
South Carolina Gamecocks women's track and field athletes
Olympic track and field athletes of the United States
Athletes (track and field) at the 2007 Pan American Games
Athletes (track and field) at the 2008 Summer Olympics
Track and field athletes from Raleigh, North Carolina
People from Fort Washington, Maryland
African-American female track and field athletes
People from Oxon Hill, Maryland
Pan American Games silver medalists for the United States
Pan American Games medalists in athletics (track and field)
World Athletics Championships winners
Medalists at the 2007 Pan American Games
Olympic female sprinters